Denis Scherbakov (born 7 August 1978, in Minsk) is a Belarusian professional football referee. He has officiated matches of the Belarusian Premier League since 2010. 

Scherbakov became a FIFA referee in 2010. He started as a fourth official behind Aleksei Kulbakov and began refereeing international matches on his own since 2012.

References

External links
 Profile at worldreferee.com
 

Belarusian football referees
1978 births
Living people